Disappointment Lake may refer to:

 Disappointment Lake, California
 Disappointment Lake (Montana), in Lake County
 Kumpupintil Lake, a lake formerly known as "Lake Disappointment" in Western Australia